Jairo Bueno Espinal (born 10 September 1998) is a Spanish-born Dominican professional footballer who plays as a defender for Dominican club CIBAO FÚTBOL CLUB and the Dominican Republic national team.

International career
Bueno made his professional debut for the Dominican Republic national football team in a 1-0 friendly over win Guadeloupe on 15 February 2019.

International goals
Scores and results list the Dominican Republic's goal tally first.

References

External links
Jairo Bueno en Fútbol Dominicano. Net
 Villarreal profile 
 
 
 

1998 births
Living people
Sportspeople from Castellón de la Plana
Citizens of the Dominican Republic through descent
Dominican Republic footballers
Dominican Republic international footballers
Spanish footballers
Spanish people of Dominican Republic descent
Sportspeople of Dominican Republic descent
Association football defenders
Tercera División players
Villarreal CF C players